Rio Bravo-Greeley Union School District  is a public school district in Kern County, California, United States.

External links

School districts in Kern County, California